Night Man is an American-Canadian live-action superhero television series, developed by Glen A. Larson, starring Matt McColm as Johnny Domino, that aired in syndication from September 15, 1997 to May 17, 1999. The series is loosely based on the character from The Night Man comic book published, through the Ultraverse imprint, by Malibu Comics, which was later purchased by Marvel Comics, and was created by Steve Englehart, who also wrote three episodes of the series.

Series overview

Episodes

Season 1 (1997–98)

Season 2 (1998–99)

Lists of American science fiction television series episodes
Lists of Marvel Comics television series episodes